The Wigan Warriors play Rugby League in Wigan, England. Their 2013 season results in the Super League XVII and 2013 Challenge Cup are shown below.

Super League

Regular season

Matches

Source:

Table

Play-offs

Source:

Challenge Cup

After finishing first in the Super League XVII as league leaders, Wigan Warriors entered the 2013 Challenge Cup at the fourth round. Wins against Leigh Centurions, Hull KR, and Widnes Vikings saw them reach the semi-finals where they nilled London Broncos in a 70 point thrashing. The final saw them nill opponents Hull F.C. to win the 2013 Challenge Cup, their 19th title, after their most last victory in 2011.

References

2013
Wigan Warriors season